Nicolau Mir Rosselló (born 10 May 2000) is a Spanish artistic gymnast who will represent Spain at the 2020 Summer Olympics.

References

External links
 

Living people
2000 births
Spanish male artistic gymnasts
Mediterranean Games gold medalists for Spain
Competitors at the 2018 Mediterranean Games
Sportspeople from Palma de Mallorca
Olympic gymnasts of Spain
Gymnasts at the 2020 Summer Olympics
Gymnasts at the 2022 Mediterranean Games
21st-century Spanish people